Liberals for Forests was an Australian political minor party. It contested both state and federal elections between 2002 and 2008, but only ever achieved one elected representative – Janet Woollard (elected as an Independent) in Western Australia. It never achieved representation at the federal level.

The party was founded in 2001 by Dr Keith Woollard, husband of Janet Woollard and an ex-AMA president. Janet successfully contested a seat in the February 2001 state election, was re-elected at the 2005 election and again at the 2008 election.

The party generally professed itself to be ideologically aligned with the centre-right sympathies of the Liberal Party of Australia, but was aligned with the ALP in certain states such as NSW but with a greater regard to environmentalism.

Despite its low profile, the party gained a respectable proportion of the primary senate vote in some states. For example, in the 2004 election it received only a few hundred votes less than the Australian Democrats in Victoria.

Name
The registered party name at the Australian Electoral Commission and the Western Australian Electoral Commission was "liberals for forests" (uncapitalised), but it was known in newspapers as "Liberals for Forests". By late 2009, Liberals for Forests was no longer a registered political party anywhere in Australia.

See also
 Small-l liberal – a term used by LFF candidates to describe themselves in order to attract the support of mildly disenchanted coalition voters

References

External links
official site (Internet Archive – snapshot 2006)

Liberal parties in Australia
Political parties established in 2001
Green political parties
Green conservative parties
2001 establishments in Australia